Stefán Karl Stefánsson (10 July 1975 – 21 August 2018) was an Icelandic actor and singer. He was best known for portraying Robbie Rotten, the antagonist of the children's television series LazyTown.

Career
Stefán Karl's career started in 1994 at the age of 19, when he worked as a puppeteer for television. During his years as a puppeteer, he had also been studying at the Drama Academy of Iceland. However, he was unsatisfied with the perspectives of Icelandic drama standards. He recalled that his principal at his high school said that "acting is not about making faces and changing your face", which he disagreed with.

Later, Stefán Karl was invited by Magnús Scheving, an Icelandic gymnast, to portray one of the characters in the second LazyTown play.  Scheving created the plays due to his concerns about Iceland's younger generation lacking sufficient physical exercise.  Stefánsson explained that "[Magnús] wanted the kids to get healthier, so he created this musical called LazyTown.  He played Sportacus, the fitness fanatic, and I was Robbie Rotten, the guy who liked to stay indoors and sleep".  After initial success with the musical, Nickelodeon eventually made a deal with the creators of LazyTown to air the first 40 episodes of LazyTown along with a special studio built in Iceland.  During the first few years of LazyTown in the early 2000s, Stefán Karl initially knew no English, but he soon became fluent.

Personal life 
Stefán Karl lived in Los Angeles with wife Steinunn Ólína Þorsteinsdóttir, three daughters, and one son. In June 2018, he was awarded the Order of the Falcon. Stefánsson was the nephew of actor and comedian Magnús Ólafsson and cousin of former footballer Hörður Magnússon.

Illness and death
Stefán Karl announced in October 2016 that he had been diagnosed with bile duct cancer. A GoFundMe campaign was subsequently created by LazyTown head writer Mark Valenti to cover his living costs when he became too ill to work. The campaign was popularized by various YouTube users uploading parodies of Stefán Karl's work, and linking to the GoFundMe page, which led to the songs "We Are Number One" and "The Mine Song" from LazyTown becoming Internet memes. In August 2017, Stefán Karl stated he was in remission. He clarified on his GoFundMe campaign that while his metastases had been removed after successful liver surgery in June 2017, he still had the disease and had refused further adjuvant therapy.

In March 2018, Stefán Karl's cancer was diagnosed as inoperable. He said that he was undergoing chemotherapy to prolong his life. In April 2018, he announced that he had chosen to discontinue chemotherapy, and proceeded to shut down all his social media accounts.

Stefán Karl died on 21 August 2018 at the age of 43. His wife stated that "Per Stefan's wishes, there will be no funeral. His earthly remains will be scattered in secrecy in a distant ocean."

Legacy 
His manager, Cheryl Edison, announced that the Stefán Karl Academy & Center for the Performing Arts would be launched in Switzerland in 2019 as a memorial to his career. Several internet petitions have been started calling for a statue of Stefán Karl to be erected in his home town of Hafnarfjörður. As of June 2022, it has received over 528,000 signatures.

Filmography 
Stefán Karl has been credited in various works including plays, television series, films, and games.

Theatre

Films 
According to IMDb:

Television

Video games

References

External links 

1975 births
2018 deaths
People from Hafnarfjörður
Icelandic male film actors
Male actors from Los Angeles
Icelandic male stage actors
Icelandic male television actors
Puppeteers
Deaths from cholangiocarcinoma
Deaths from cancer in Iceland
Icelandic expatriates in the United States
Knights of the Order of the Falcon